Anne-Marie Garat (9 October 1946 – 26 July 2022) was a French novelist.

Studying literature in Bordeaux, she then obtained a DEA in cinema at the université de Paris I.  She lived in Paris, where she taught cinema and photography.  Jack Lang then commissioned her to teach cinema at the école.

She has published several novels, psychological in nature and with major female characters.  They are set in various eras of the 20th century (e.g. the 1910s for Dans la main du diable, the Second World War for Les mal famées).

Following Dans la main du diable set before World War I in 1914, Anne-Marie Garat pursued in 2008, with L'enfant des ténèbres, her epic depiction of the 20th century, bringing up the period of 1930s and the rise of the totalitarian dictatorships.

Works
 L'homme de Blaye, Flammarion, 1984
 Voie non classée, Flammarion, 1985
 L'insomniaque, Flammarion, 1987
 Le monarque égaré, Flammarion, 1989 ; Seuil, 1996
 Chambre noire, Flammarion, 1990 – Prix Alain-Fournier
 Aden, Seuil, 1992 – Prix Femina
 Photos de familles, Seuil, 1994
 Merle, Seuil, 1996
 Dans la pente du toit, Seuil, 1998
 L'amour de loin, Actes Sud, 1998
 Itsvan arrive par le train du soir, Seuil, 1999
 Les mal famées, Actes Sud, 2000 ; Babel N°557 – 
 Nous nous connaissons déjà, Actes Sud, 2003 ; Babel n°741
 La Rotonde, Actes Sud, 2004
  Une faim de loup. Lecture du Petit Chaperon rouge, Actes Sud, 2004
 Dans la main du diable, Actes Sud, 2006
 On ne peut pas continuer comme ça, Atelier In8, 2006
 Un tout petit coeur,actes sud junior,2004

External links
 Official site of Anne Marie Garat
 Actes Sud
 atelier in8
 Review of Nous nous connaissons déjà by Jean-Claude Lebrun in l'Humanité

1946 births
2022 deaths
Writers from Bordeaux
French historical novelists
University of Bordeaux alumni
University of Paris alumni
Pantheon-Sorbonne University alumni
Prix Femina winners
French women novelists
Women historical novelists
Prix Alain-Fournier winners
Prix Renaudot des lycéens winners